Kurunta is the Hittite god of wild animals and hunting.

Kurunta's Insignia was the deer. He became king of gods after he had thrown Tarhun down from the sky. The god rebel forces humanity against the gods and even does not care about the powerful gods. Because of the wish of gods to get sacrifices furthermore without getting them Enki and Kumarbi unite against Kurunta. With help of Nara-Napsara, the brother of A'as from the underworld, they force all animals and the mountain god Nasalma against Kurunta. After that Kurunta is killed by Tarhun and Ninurta so he accepts Tarhun's sovereignty. Kurunta takes part at the conference of gods after Telipinu's return. He is also the saving god of Carchemish.

See also
Runtiya
Innara

Literature
 Volkert Haas: Die hethitische Literatur. Walter de Gruyter GmbH & Co. KG, Berlin 2006, pages 84, 111, 144 ff.,

Further reading
 Woudhuizen, Fred. "Luwian Kuruntas and Celtic Cernunnos: two closely related manifestations of the same Indo-European god". In: Živa Antika [Antiquité Vivante 64 (2014): 55–60.  

Hittite deities
Hittite mythology